Kumbiser is a rural locality (a village) in Baydarovskoye Rural Settlement, Nikolsky District, Vologda Oblast, Russia. The population was 77 as of 2002.  There are 2 streets.

Geography 
Kumbiser is located 15 km northeast of Nikolsk (the district's administrative centre) by road. Krivyatskoye is the nearest rural locality.

References 

Rural localities in Nikolsky District, Vologda Oblast